The Trinity Strand Trail is a proposed 7.8-mile, hike/bike commuter and recreational trail that will run along the course of the original Trinity River in Dallas, Texas (USA), also known as Old Meanders. This part of the Trinity River flows through the heart of the Dallas Design District. Trinity Strand Trail plays a key part in the vision for the Old Trinity River corridor. It will provide a recreational resource for the area and will also connect to Katy Trail, the Southwestern Medical District, Dallas Market Center and several residential and commercial properties.

About 
Nestled between Stemmons Freeway and the banks of the Trinity River, just northwest of downtown Dallas, are the Dallas Design District and the Old Trinity Industrial District. Like other neighborhoods near downtown Dallas, this area is being rediscovered by forward-thinking property owners, businesses and new residents. The neighborhood is growing with new developments, including restaurants (including Meddlesome Moth and Oak), bars, retail and residential units.

Once the trail is complete, Dallas residents and visitors can walk or bike between homes, hotels, DART/TRE stations, and work places in downtown Dallas, Oak Cliff, Uptown, the Design District, and the Trinity Industrial District.

The location of the “Strand” plays a key part of the redevelopment vision for the Trinity River Corridor Project. The Strand will connect the Katy Trail to the Trinity River Levee Trail and the entire Trinity River Greenbelt. This unites many Dallas, Texas (USA) neighborhoods and offers pedestrians, cyclists, and commuters access to many business districts, in addition to the obvious recreational benefits of the trail.

Organization information and history 
In 2002, a group of dedicated individuals formed the Friends of the Trinity Strand Trail, a nonprofit corporation to spearhead the planning, construction and enhancement of a 7.8 mile non-motorized hike and bike trail along the original Trinity River watercourse. This commuter and recreational trail will connect the Katy Trail to the Trinity River and also provide Dallas citizens access to the Southwestern Medical District, Dallas Market Center, Stemmons Corridor businesses and the Dallas Design District. The trail will consist of 5.6 miles of paved concrete trail and 2.2 miles of soft surface trail, 10 bridges and 16 trailheads. The trail will connect 4.7 miles of existing and 7.9 miles of future sidewalks for a total of 20.4 total miles of non-motorized interconnected trails, bridges and sidewalks with a build-out cost of $30 million.

The trail will not only reduce traffic congestion by providing an alternate method to commute to and from work, but it will also improve air quality, provide recreation and transportation opportunities for Dallas citizens and visitors to the city, promote ecotourism, and restore the natural wildlife habitat along the original meanders of the Trinity River. Additionally, the trail will present an opportunity for education and instruction by providing a nature preserve consisting of native wildflowers and grasses. It will also attract new business and residential projects to the neighborhood, which has been predominantly industrial and mostly forgotten until now. The Trinity Strand Trail will greatly enhance the range and benefits of the Katy Trail and Trinity River Levee Trails by providing a non-motorized route for Dallas residents and visitors to travel easily from either the Katy Trail (through Stemmons Park) or from Victory Plaza (along Hi Line Drive) to the many miles of levee trails.

Recent accomplishments 
Trail construction began in 2009 with a trailhead at the end of Hi-Line Drive and followed with Turtle Creek Plaza, which was completed in May 2010 and celebrated with a dedication ceremony by former Mayor Leppert. The blue 14’ 7” I-beam at Turtle Creek Plaza represents the height of the Trinity River during the 1908 flood which prompted the re-directing of the Trinity River. Both of these trailheads are on the original Trinity River channel, also referred to as “Old Meanders”. Trinity Strand Trail has raised $5.5M in funding for Phase 1 (2.5 miles of concrete trail along the old river channel) and construction on this portion of the trail has been completed. 

Trinity Strand Trail has also funded $400K for Phase 2 through the Dallas Design District TIF. Phase 2 includes the design and construction of two miles of soft surface trail along the opposite side of the river channel with numerous low water crossings and bridges throughout the channel. Both trails will run alongside the old Trinity River channel, a beautiful and natural greenspace in Dallas that has been neglected and somewhat forgotten. Trinity Strand Trail is working to restore this area and bring it back to its natural state with the environmental restoration piece of our project.

Unlike most trails that use abandoned railway corridors for their path, Trinity Strand Trail acquires land for its trail through landowner donations. Over 5 acres of land has been donated by area stakeholders for Phase 1.

Trinity Strand Trail is designated part of the Dallas County Veloweb Trail System and the master plan was adopted in July 2004 by the Dallas Park and Recreation Board and the Dallas City Council. In 2004, Trinity Strand Trail obtained city park designation from the Dallas City Council.

Trinity Strand Trail/Katy Trail Connection 
Trinity Strand Trail has partnered with the Friends of the Katy Trail to connect both trails at Goat Hill and the land donation, valued at $2M, was secured in November 2007. The master plan for the Connection was approved by the City of Dallas Parks and Recreation Board in 2011, and 50% of the schematic design and 75% of the hydrology studies are also complete.

The Trinity Strand Trail/Katy Trail Connection is a joint trail project between Trinity Strand Trail and Katy Trail. This project will connect 3.5 miles of Katy Trail with almost 8 miles of Trinity Strand Trail. The Connection will begin at Katy Trail’s Victory Overlook and travel over Houston Street, through Stemmons Park and underneath Stemmons Freeway and Oak Lawn Avenue, connecting with the concrete spine of Trinity Strand Trail on the old Trinity River channel. When complete, this trail will join Uptown, downtown, the Dallas Design District, Southwestern Medical District, the Infomart, Stemmons Corridor businesses, and hotels in the area.

The Connection will also serve as an accessory connection to a future city park that will function as a landscaped gateway in the area, traveling through Stemmons Park, an undeveloped piece of land near the intersection of Stemmons Freeway and Oak Lawn Avenue. This park is rich with history and used to house P.C. Cobb Stadium, a 23,000 seat arena for high school sports. Since the stadium was demolished in 1985, it has been used as a dumping ground and construction staging site, which has unfortunately destroyed the native habitat and vegetation in the area.

In addition, a natural creek winds through the park. This portion of Turtle Creek is a small tributary of the Trinity River, with its headwaters located in University Park. Trinity Strand Trail will restore life back into this creek and the surrounding area and provide a natural space for relaxation within the highly urban Medical District, Dallas Market Center, Design District and downtown Dallas.

Market and customers 
Trinity Strand Trail will serve the area’s 12+ hotels which supply 1 million room nights per year. The trail will also serve the 170,000 employees of major companies and smaller businesses in the area. In addition, there is an estimated 1,900 residential units which exist on or by the trail and approximately 600 more that are currently under construction. This project facilitates active lifestyles and provides appealing, safe transportation alternatives to these urban residents and commuters. Furthermore, the Katy Trail has more than 15,000 participants per week and with the Trinity Strand Trail/Katy Trail Connection, it is estimated that the majority of those recreational users will also utilize Trinity Strand Trail.

Notably, Trinity Strand Trail will serve the Southwestern Medical District which has over 24,000 employees and garners over 2.2 million visits to their facilities each year. Most of these visitors use public transit to travel to and from the area and our trail will provide safe and easy access to existing sidewalks and improved access to DART and TRE.

Environmental restoration 
Trinity Strand Trail is developing an environmental restoration strategy to bring the Old Meanders back to life and restore it to a native North Texas habitat, thereby attracting beneficial wildlife to this urban preserve. Over the years, the path of the river was changed to prevent flooding, leaving Old Meanders isolated and almost unknown to most residents. Trinity Strand Trail plans to make use of this 65 acre gem of hidden green space that exists.

Through cooperative efforts with naturalists, environmental professionals, city staff and interested parties, we plan to create an environment that is enjoyable, educational and beneficial to residents and visitors of Dallas. Plans for Old Meanders include exploring the use of the channel to provide pollution filtration for storm water runoff, thus improving wildlife habitat and the aesthetic beauty of the area. Additional plans include hands-on educational programs for local schools and organizations to educate Dallas citizens on the importance of ecological restoration and keeping our water clean.

Dallas Jingle Bell Run 
Over the past few years, Trinity Strand Trail has been developing the Dallas Jingle Bell Run. The Jingle Bell Run is an annual event that was held by Carter BloodCare for over twenty years, and it has recognition throughout the city. In 2009, Trinity Strand Trail partnered with Luke’s Locker and the Mavericks Foundation to take over this event. In recent years, the Jingle Bell Run had almost 6,000 runners, 150 volunteers and 35 sponsors supporting the event.

References

External links
 Trinity Strand Trail website
 Jingle Bell Run website

Bike paths in Texas
Transportation in Dallas